This article shows the qualifying draw for the 2010 Rogers Cup.

Players

Seeds

Qualifiers

Lucky losers
  Somdev Devvarman
  Paul-Henri Mathieu

Results

First qualifier

Second qualifier

Third qualifier

Fourth qualifier

Fifth qualifier

Sixth qualifier

Seventh qualifier

References
 Qualifying Draw

Rogers Cup - Men's Singles Qualifying
Qualifying
Qualification for tennis tournaments